Mospyne is a city of district significance in the Proletarskyi District of the Donetsk municipality, Donetsk Oblast (province) of Ukraine, 8 km southeast of Donetsk. Population in 2001 was 11,736. Since 2014, the city has been under the control of the self-declared Donetsk People's Republic.

On 13 May 1919, Andrei Shkuro's Volunteer Army battled with the Makhnovshchina for control of Mospyne, resulting in the White movement capturing the city and the Makhnovists being driven back.

Demographics
Native language as of the Ukrainian Census of 2001:
Russian  93.47%
Ukrainian  6.35%

References

Cities in Donetsk Oblast
Cities of district significance in Ukraine
Populated places established in the Russian Empire
Donetsk Raion